Mounds View is a city in Ramsey County, Minnesota, United States. The population was 12,155 at the 2010 census. It is part of the Twin Cities Metropolitan Area.

U.S. Highway 10, County Road 10, and Interstate Highway 35W are three of the main routes in the city.

Geography

Rice Creek flows through the southeast part of Mounds View.

Nearby places include Shoreview, Arden Hills, New Brighton, Fridley, Spring Lake Park, and Blaine.  The boundary line between Ramsey and Anoka counties is nearby.

History
The city of Mounds View was located in the former Mounds View Township, which was organized in 1858.  In 1958, 100 years after Minnesota became a state, the village of Mounds View was incorporated.  Post-World War II growth was partially fueled by the proximity of the Twin Cities Arsenal. Calvin Academy relocated to the area in 1999.

The city is primarily residential, with several business parks and businesses located in Mounds View.  The bulk of businesses are located along the County Road 10 corridor, with most residential areas flanking it to the north and south.  Some of the businesses include Multitech's headquarters, Liberty Checks and Sysco Distributing.

A petroleum pipeline exploded in Mounds View on July 8, 1986. Two-hundred people had to evacuate their homes and two people, a mother and her young daughter, were killed.  The Office of Pipeline Safety was created in response to the tragedy.

In 2005, the Mounds View City Council voted to sell the city-owned golf course, "The Bridges of Mounds View", to Medtronic, Inc., to become its new campus. The new campus is located in the north east corner of the city and opened Fall of 2007.

In June 2016, the Mounds View city council voted to change the name of County Road 10 to Mounds View Blvd for the city’s portion of the road.

Demographics

2010 census
As of the census of 2010, there were 12,155 people, 4,954 households, and 3,236 families residing in the city. The racial makeup of the city was 81.3% White, 5.5% African American, 0.8% Native American, 7.0% Asian, 0.1% Pacific Islander, 2.3% from other races, and 3.1% from two or more races. Hispanic or Latino of any race were 5.0% of the population.

There were 4,954 households, of which 31.6% had children under the age of 18 living with them, 47.5% were married couples living together, 12.8% had a female householder with no husband present, 5.0% had a male householder with no wife present, and 34.7% were non-families. 27.8% of all households were made up of individuals, and 8.4% had someone living alone who was 65 years of age or older. The average household size was 2.45 and the average family size was 2.98.

The median age in the city was 37.8 years. 23.1% of residents were under the age of 18; 8.8% were between the ages of 18 and 24; 27.9% were from 25 to 44; 27.6% were from 45 to 64; and 12.6% were 65 years of age or older. The gender makeup of the city was 50.1% male and 49.9% female.

2000 census
As of the census of 2000, there were 12,738 people, 5,018 households, and 3,387 families residing in the city. The racial makeup of the city was 90.65% White, 2.40% African American, 0.66% Native American, 3.12% Asian, 0.05% Pacific Islander, 1.02% from other races, and 2.09% from two or more races. Hispanic or Latino of any race were 2.62% of the population.

There were 5,018 households, out of which 33.5% had children under the age of 18 living with them, 50.8% were married couples living together, 12.2% had a female householder with no husband present, and 32.5% were non-families. 23.9% of all households were made up of individuals, and 6.6% had someone living alone who was 65 years of age or older.  The average household size was 2.53 and the average family size was 3.02.

In the city, the population was spread out, with 25.8% under the age of 18, 10.5% from 18 to 24, 32.4% from 25 to 44, 22.4% from 45 to 64, and 8.9% who were 65 years of age or older.  The median age was 34 years. For every 100 females, there were 99.7 males.  For every 100 females age 18 and over, there were 97.5 males.

The median income for a household in the city was $51,974, and the median income for a family was $60,685. Males had a median income of $37,418 versus $29,196 for females. The per capita income for the city was $24,271.  About 4.4% of families and 5.9% of the population were below the poverty line, including 9.4% of those under age 18 and 5.2% of those age 65 or over.

References

External links
City of Mounds View Homepage

Cities in Minnesota
Cities in Ramsey County, Minnesota
Populated places established in 1958
1958 establishments in Minnesota